The Swiss Inventory of Cultural Property of National and Regional Significance is a register of cultural property in Switzerland. It was established according to article 5 of the second protocol to the Hague Convention for the Protection of Cultural Property in the Event of Armed Conflict, which provides for the establishment of national registers of cultural property.

Scope

The register contains both mobile and immobile items of cultural property including old towns, quarters, squares, villages, sacral buildings, houses, castles, bridges, monuments, archaeological sites and collections. Its entries are classified in two groups: those of national significance (class A) and those of regional significance (class B). The selection is based on the significance of the items in the domains of history, aesthetics, art, typology, ethnography, social studies and in other scientific disciplines, as well as on their rarity value. Items of purely local significance are not included; these may be registered separately by the cantonal authorities.

Publication history

The register is prepared by the Federal Office of Civil Protection in cooperation with the cantonal authorities and formally issued by the Federal Council. It was first published in 1988 and re-issued in updated form in 1995 and 2009. The 2009 revision covers only A-class objects, with the B-class objects set to be reviewed and updated at a later time. Until then, the lists of B-class objects published by the Office include the B-class objects of the 1995 inventory, the proposals for new or changed B-class objects submitted by the cantonal authorities, and the former A-class objects not retained as nationally significant in the 2009 review.

The Federal Office of Civil Protection has made the 2009 register of A-class objects (current as of 1 April 2010) available on the Internet as a geographic information system and as a set of PDF documents. A printed catalogue (publication no. 408.980) was published in 2010.

List details

Lists

See also
Inventory of Swiss Heritage Sites
Architecture of Switzerland
List of castles and fortresses in Switzerland
List of museums in Switzerland
Lists of tourist attractions in Switzerland

References

External links
Swiss Inventory of Cultural Property of National and Regional Significance (KGS 2009 edition):
KGS Inventory
KGS Geographic Information System−GIS map
 
Images
 
 
 

Inventory, Cultural Property
 01
 01
Buildings and structures in Switzerland
Cultural heritage of Switzerland
Swiss culture
Tourist attractions in Switzerland